Samsa may refer to:

 Samsa (writer), Indian playwright
 Samsa (food), a central Asian samosa
 Samsa (삼사), or the Three offices of Joseon, government bodies in Korea
Gregor Samsa, main character of Kafka's The Metamorphosis